This is a list of rock groups described as power trios – bands consisting of electric guitar, bass, and drums.

The prototypical power trio is the British band Cream, founded in 1966 with Eric Clapton on guitar/vocals, Jack Bruce on bass/vocals, and Ginger Baker on drums.

A
 Adrian Belew Power Trio
 Agent Orange
 Alkaline Trio
 American Authors (Quartet from 2006 to 2021, trio since 2021)
 Arcane Roots
 Arcwelder
 The Aristocrats
 Ash
 Autolux

B
 Babes in Toyland
 Back Door Slam
 Band of Skulls
 Beck, Bogert & Appice
 Biffy Clyro
 The Big Three
 Black Rebel Motorcycle Club
 Blink-182
 Blue Cheer
 Blue Murder
 Boris (except for occasional fourth member Michio Kurihara on guitar)
 Boygenius
 Bratmobile
 Brutus
 Budgie
 Buffalo Tom

C
 California Breed
 Chevelle
 Clear Blue Sky
 Coroner
 Cosmic Psychos
 Cream
 The Cribs (except when Johnny Marr was a member)

D
 Dada
 Danko Jones
 Death
 Die! Die! Die!
 Dinosaur Jr.
 Divididos
 Doctor Victor
 Dust
 Dying Fetus

E
 Earl Greyhound
 Elliott Brood
 Emerson, Lake and Palmer
 Everclear
 The Evidence

F
 Failure
 The Fall of Troy
 Feeder
 Firehose
 The Fratellis
 Freak Kitchen
 Fudge Tunnel
 Fun Lovin' Criminals

G
 Galaxie 500
 George Thorogood and the Delaware Destroyers
 Glass Harp
 Godflesh
 Grand Funk Railroad
 Grand Magus
 Green Day
 Guitar Wolf

H
 Heroes & Zeros
 High on Fire
 Highly Suspect
 Buddy Holly and the Crickets
 Hot Tuna (three power trio albums from 1974 to 1977)
 House of Large Sizes
 Hüsker Dü
 Hot Club de Paris

I
 Interpol

J
 James Gang
  Jawbreaker
 The Jimi Hendrix Experience
 John Mayer Trio
 The Joy Formidable

K
 Kamchatka
 Karma to Burn
 Killdozer
 King's X
 KXM
 Khruangbin

L
 Lifehouse
 The Lawrence Arms
 Leño
 Leusemia
 The London Souls
 Los Lonely Boys
 Low

M
 Manic Street Preachers
 Mantra Sunrise
 May Blitz
 Meat Puppets
 Melvins
 Menomena
 Metz
 Minutemen 
 Mischief Brew
 Modest Mouse (between 1996 and 1997)
 Mondo Generator
 Morphine
 Motörhead
 Mountain
 Muse
 MxPx
 Motorpsycho

N
 Nada Surf  until 2010, when Doug Gillard joined on second guitar 
 Nebula
 Niacin
 The Nice
 Nirvana
 Nomeansno

O
 One Man Army
 The Outfield

P
 Paramore
 Peer Günt
 Pepper
 Peter Bjorn and John
 Placebo
 The Police
 The Presidents of the United States of America
 Primus
 Los Prisioneros
 Prong

Q
 Qui

R
 Radio Moscow
 Raven (quartet 1974–1981, power trio 1981–present)
 The Rods
 Rose Hill Drive
 Rush
 Russian Circles

S
 Sasquatch
 Sausage
 The Screaming Blue Messiahs
 Screaming Females
 Sebadoh
 The Secret Machines
 Shellac
 Shrug
 Silverchair
 Sick Puppies
 Sleater-Kinney
 Sleep
 Soda Stereo
 Soft Machine
 Spiderbait
 State Radio
 Stick Men
 The Steepwater Band
 Steve Morse Band
 Stevie Ray Vaughan and Double Trouble (until 1985, when Reese Wynans was added)
 Stöner
 Stray Cats
 Sublime
 The Subways
 Sugar
 Sunflower Bean (until 2019, when Danny Ayala was added)
 Super 400

T
 Talas
 Taste
 Tera Melos
 The Tea Party
 Therapy?
 The Thermals
 Them Crooked Vultures
 Thirty Seconds to Mars
 Those Darlins
 Tiger Army
 Tiny Moving Parts
 Triumph
 Triggerfinger
 TTNG

U
 U.K.
 Unearthly Trance
 Urge Overkill

V
 Vampire Weekend (began as a quartet and became a rock trio when Rostam Batmanglij left the band in 2016)
 Vardis
 Venom
 Violent Femmes
 Voice of Baceprot

W
 Wakrat
 Walt Mink
 The Warning
 West, Bruce and Laing
 Wild Adriatic
 White Lies
 The Winery Dogs
 Wipers
 Wolfmother
 The Wombats

X
 The XX

Y
 Yawning Man
 Yeah Yeah Yeahs
 Year Long Disaster
 The Young Gods
 Young Knives
 Yo La Tengo

Z
 Zebra
 ZZ Top

#
 50 Foot Wave
 The 5.6.7.8s

References

Power trio
+List